"I'm Your Puppet" is a song written by Dan Penn and Spooner Oldham; the best known version is the one recorded by James & Bobby Purify which reached #5 on the US R&B chart and #6 on the Billboard Hot 100 in 1966. The single was nominated for a Grammy Award for Best R&B Performance by a Duo or Group with Vocals in 1967. The song was featured on their 1967 album, James & Bobby Purify.

The duo released a re-recorded version as a single in 1976 which reached #12 on the UK Singles Chart and #20 in New Zealand.  In Canada, it reached #4.

Papa Don Enterprises produced the song, and it was arranged by Penn and Don Schroeder.

The single ranked #46 on the Billboard Year-End Hot 100 singles of 1966.

Chart history

Weekly charts

Year-end charts

Other charting versions
Cam-Pact released a version of the song as the B-side to their 1968 single "Drawing Room".  Their version charted regionally in Australia, reaching #17 in Melbourne and #26 in Brisbane.
Dianne Leigh released a version of the song as a single in 1970 which reached #32 on the Canadian country chart.
Dionne Warwick released a version of the song as a single in 1972 which reached #113 on the US pop chart.  It was featured on her 1969 album, Soulful.
Mickey Gilley released a version of the song as a single in 1988 which reached #49 on the US country chart.

Other versions
Penn released the original version of the song as a single in 1965.
Sam & Dave released a version of the song on their 1966 album, Double Dynamite.
Sandy Posey released a version of the song as the B-side to her 1967 single "Don't Touch Me".
Geno Washington & the Ram Jam Band released a version of the song on their 1967 EP Different Strokes.
The Box Tops released a version of the song on their 1967 album The Letter/Neon Rainbow.
Dandy Livingstone released a version of the song as a single in 1969.
Marvin Gaye and Tammi Terrell released a version of the song on their 1969 album, Easy, and as the B-side to their 1970 single "California Soul".
Donny Osmond released a version of the song on his 1971 album, The Donny Osmond Album.
Mel and Tim released a version of the song on their 1972 album, Starting All Over Again.
Dionne Warwick's 1972 cover reached #113 (U.S.).
Foster Sylvers released a version of the song on his 1973 album, Foster Sylvers.
Jimmy London released a version of the song as a single in 1975.
Derrick Harriott released a version of the song on his 1982 album, Acid Rock.
Haywoode released a version of the song as a single in 1987.
Glen Brown and Lloyd Parks released a version of the song on Brown's 1989 compilation album, Boat to Progress! The Original Pantomine Vocal Collection 1970-74.
Elton John and Paul Young released a version of the song on John's 1993 album, Duets.
Helen Watson released a version of the song on her 1999 album, Doffing.
Yo La Tengo released a version of the song as the B-side to their 2006 single "Mr. Tough".
American Music Club released a version of the song on their 2008 album, Atwater Afternoon.
Joe Pernice released a version of the song on his 2009 album, It Feels So Good When I Stop.
Cliff Richard and Percy Sledge released a version of the song on Richard's 2011 album, Soulicious.
The Golden Cups released a version of the song on their 1968 debut album.
The Raconteurs performed a live rendition of the song at FAME Studios in 2019 for the Amazon Music Originals series (also available on YouTube).

Sampled versions
Grand Daddy I.U. sampled the song on his song "Something New" which was featured on his 1990 album, Smooth Assassin.
Tragedy Khadafi sampled the song on his 1990 song "Live & Direct From The House Of Hits".
Hi-C sampled the song on his song "I'm Not Your Puppet" which was featured on his 1991 album, Skanless.  The song reached #63 on the Billboard Hot 100.

In media
James and Bobby Purify's version was used in the 1995 film My Family.
Bobby Womack released a version that was featured in the 2000 film Meet the Parents.
James & Bobby Purify's version was in the 2008 film Soul Men.

References

1965 songs
1965 singles
1966 singles
1969 singles
1970 singles
1972 singles
1975 singles
1976 singles
1987 singles
1988 singles
Songs written by Dan Penn
Songs written by Spooner Oldham
James & Bobby Purify songs
Dianne Leigh songs
Dionne Warwick songs
Mickey Gilley songs
Irma Thomas songs
Bell Records singles